An attribute grammar is a formal way to supplement a formal grammar with semantic information processing. Semantic information is stored in attributes associated with terminal and nonterminal symbols of the grammar. The values of attributes are result of attribute evaluation rules associated with productions of the grammar. Attributes allow to transfer information from anywhere in the abstract syntax tree to anywhere else, in a controlled and formal way.

Each semantic function deals with attributes of symbols occurring only in one production rule: both semantic function parameters and its result are attributes of symbols from one particular rule. When a semantic function defines the value of an attribute of the symbol on the left hand side of the rule, the attribute is called synthesized; otherwise it is called inherited. Thus, synthesized attributes serve to pass semantic information up the parse tree, while inherited attributes allow values to be passed from the parent nodes down and across the syntax tree.

In simple applications, such as evaluation of arithmetic expressions, attribute grammar may be used to describe the entire task to be performed besides parsing in straightforward way; in complicated systems, for instance, when constructing a language translation tool, such as a compiler, it may be used to validate semantic checks associated with a grammar, representing the rules of a language not explicitly imparted by the syntax definition. It may be also used by parsers or compilers to translate the syntax tree directly into code for some specific machine, or into some intermediate language.

History
Attribute grammars were invented by Donald Knuth and Peter Wegner. While Donald Knuth is credited for the overall concept, Peter Wegner invented inherited attributes during a conversation with Knuth. Some embryonic ideas trace back to the work of Edgar T. "Ned" Irons, the author of IMP.

Example
The following is a simple context-free grammar which can describe a language made up of multiplication and addition of integers.

  Expr → Expr + Term
  Expr → Term
  Term → Term * Factor
  Term → Factor
  Factor → "(" Expr ")"
  Factor → integer

The following attribute grammar can be used to calculate the result of an expression written in the grammar. Note that this grammar only uses synthesized values, and is therefore an S-attributed grammar.
  Expr1 → Expr2 + Term [ Expr1.value = Expr2.value + Term.value ]
  Expr → Term [ Expr.value = Term.value ]
  Term1 → Term2 * Factor [ Term1.value = Term2.value * Factor.value ]
  Term → Factor [ Term.value = Factor.value ]
  Factor → "(" Expr ")" [ Factor.value =  Expr.value ]
  Factor → integer [ Factor.value = strToInt(integer.str) ]

Synthesized attributes
A synthesized attribute is computed from the values of attributes of the children. Since the values of the children must be computed first, this is an example of bottom-up propagation. To formally define a synthesized attribute, let  be a formal grammar, where

  is the set of non terminal symbols
  is the set of terminal symbols
  is the set of productions
  is the distinguished, or start, symbol

Then, given a string of nonterminal symbols  and an attribute name ,  is a synthesized attribute if all three of these conditions are met:

  (i.e.  is one of the rules in the grammar)
 (i.e. every symbol in the body of the rule is either nonterminal or terminal)
, where  (i.e. the value of the attribute is a function  applied to some values from the symbols in the body of the rule)

Inherited attributes
An inherited attribute at a node in parse tree is defined using the attribute values at the parent or siblings. Inherited attributes are convenient for expressing the dependence of a programming language construct on the context in which it appears. For example, we can use an inherited attribute to keep track of whether an identifier appears on the left or the right side of an assignment in order to decide whether the address or the value of the identifier is needed. In contrast to synthesized attributes, inherited attributes can take values from parent and/or siblings. As in the following production,

 S → ABC

where A can get values from S, B, and C. B can take values from S, A, and C. Likewise, C can take values from S, A, and B.

Special types of attribute grammars
 L-attributed grammar: inherited attributes can be evaluated in one left-to-right traversal of the abstract syntax tree
 LR-attributed grammar: an L-attributed grammar whose inherited attributes can also be evaluated in bottom-up parsing.
 ECLR-attributed grammar: a subset of LR-attributed grammars where equivalence classes can be used to optimize the evaluation of inherited attributes.
 S-attributed grammar: a simple type of attribute grammar, using only synthesized attributes, but no inherited attributes

See also
 Affix grammar
 Van Wijngaarden grammar
 Syntax-directed translation

References

 Original paper introducing attributed grammars: , backup

External links
 Why Attribute Grammars Matter, The Monad Reader, Issue 4, July 5, 2005. (This article narrates on how the formalism of attribute grammars brings aspect-oriented programming to functional programming by helping writing catamorphisms compositionally. It refers to the Utrecht University Attribute Grammar system (see also Lrc: A Purely Functional, Higher-Order Attribute Grammar based System) as the implementation used in the examples.)
 Attribute grammar in relation to Haskell and functional programming.
 Jukka Paakki: Attribute grammar paradigms—a high-level methodology in language implementation. ACM Computing Surveys 27:2 (June 1995), 196–255.
 Ox is an attribute grammar compiling system that augments Lex and Yacc specifications with definitions of synthesized and inherited attributes written in a combination of Ox and C/C++ syntax. From these specifications, Ox generates ordinary Lex and Yacc specifications that build and decorate an attributed parse tree. Ox works with the Lex and Yacc versions distributed in the Unix and Solaris operating systems, Flex, RE/flex, Bison, BYacc, BtYacc and MSTA (in the DINO GitHub repository). (See the SourceForge repository.)
 Silver is an extensible attribute grammar specification language and system from University of Minnesota. (See also the GitHub repository.)

Formal languages
Compiler construction
Parsing